Kinara is an American semiconductor company that develops AI processors for machine learning applications.

History
Kinara was founded in 2013 by Rehan Hameed and Wajahat Qadeer as CoreViz. The company was rebranded as Deep Vision, and received $35M in a series B funding round lead by Tiger Global Management. In 2022 rebranded as Kinara.

Kinara has partnerships with NXP Semiconductors and Arcturus Networks.

Products
In 2020, the company announced its first product, the Ara-1 Edge AI Processor. The product uses a polymorphic dataflow architecture.

References

External links
Kinara

Semiconductor companies of the United States
Technology companies based in the San Francisco Bay Area